is a Japanese monthly manga magazine published by Kōdansha. The magazine was started in September 2009 as a spin-off of another Kōdansha magazine, Weekly Shōnen Magazine.

Currently running manga series

Past series 

 ×××Holic by Clamp (2010–2011, moved from Weekly Young Magazine)
 Aho-Girl by Hiroyuki (2015–2017, moved from Weekly Shōnen Magazine)
 Aka no Grimoire by A-10 (2018–2020)
 Animal Land by Makoto Raiku (2009–2014)
 As the Gods Will by Muneyuki Kaneshiro (2011–2012)
 Attack on Titan by Hajime Isayama (2009–2021)
 Attack on Titan: Junior High by Saki Nakagawa, original by Hajime Isayama (2012–2016)
 Attack on Titan: Lost Girls by Ryōsuke Fuji, original by Hajime Isayama (2015–2016)
 Boarding School Juliet by Yosuke Kaneda (2015–2017, moved to Weekly Shōnen Magazine)
 Fairy Gone by Ryōsuke Fuji (2019)
 The Flowers of Evil by Shūzō Oshimi (2009–2014)
 From the New World by Tōru Oikawa, Yūsuke Kishi (2012–2014)
 Half & Half by Kōji Seo (2012–2015)
 Happiness by Shūzō Oshimi (2015–2019)
 Ixion Saga by Yūsaku Komiyama (2012–2013)
 Joshiraku by Kōji Kumeta (2009–2013)
 Jūjika no Rokunin by Nakatake Shiryū (2020, moved to Magazine Pocket)
 Kami-sama no Iu Toori by Akeji Fujimura, Muneyuki Kaneshiro (2011–2012)
 LovePlus Rinko Days by Kōji Seo (2010–2012)
 Mardock Scramble by Yoshitoki Ōima, Tow Ubukata (2009–2012)
 Negiho by Yui (2010–2011) 
 O Maidens in Your Savage Season by Mari Okada, Nao Emoto (2016–2019)
 Real Account by Okushou, Watanabe Shizumu (2014–2019, moved to Weekly Shōnen Magazine)  
 Sankarea: Undying Love by Mitsuru Hattori (2009–2014)
 Seisen Cerberus by Seijirō Narumi (2013)
 Sweet Poolside by Shūzō Oshimi (2011)
 The Little Lies We All Tell by Madoka Kashihara (2020-2023)
 Tsuredure Children by Toshiya Wakabayashi (2014–2015, moved to Weekly Shōnen Magazine)
 UQ Holder! by Ken Akamatsu, (2016–2022, moved from Weekly Shōnen Magazine)

References

External links 
 別冊少年マガジン Official web site at Kodansha 
 

Kodansha magazines
Monthly manga magazines published in Japan
Magazines established in 2009
2009 establishments in Japan
Shōnen manga magazines
Magazines published in Tokyo